Felix Götze (born 11 February 1998) is a German professional footballer who plays as a midfielder or centre-back for  club Rot-Weiss Essen, on loan from FC Augsburg.

Club career

Youth career
Götze played for Borussia Dortmund until 2014, when he moved to the youth academy of Bayern Munich. Götze began in Bayern's under-17 team for the 2014–15 season, before moving up to the under-19 team for the 2015–16 season. In 2017, Götze won the 2016–17 A-Junioren Bundesliga Süd/Südwest with the under-19 team, scoring six times during the season. The team went on to advance to the final of the A-Junioren Bundesliga championship round, before losing to Borussia Dortmund 8–7 on penalties.

Bayern Munich
On 24 May 2017, Götze signed a professional contract with Bayern, with a two-year contract lasting until 2019.

Götze began his senior career with Bayern Munich II in the 2017–18 season, making his debut in the Regionalliga Bayern on 29 September 2017 in a 3–1 away loss against Wacker Burghausen. His first goal for the reserve team came on 3 November 2017, opening the scoring in the 26th minute in a 2–0 away win against FC Ingolstadt II.

FC Augsburg
On 1 July 2018, Götze moved on a free transfer to FC Augsburg, where he signed a four-year contract. He played his first match in the first round of the 2018–19 DFB-Pokal, a match ended with Augsburg winning 2–1 against TSV Steinbach Haiger. On 1 September 2018, he finally made his debut in the Bundesliga in a 1–1 draw against Borussia Mönchengladbach, in which he came on as a substitute in the 75th minute. On 25 September 2018, Götze scored the equaliser in the 87th minute in a match that finished 1–1 against his former club, Bayern Munich.

Loan to Kaiserslautern
On 1 February 2021, the last day of the 2020–21 winter transfer window, he moved to 3. Liga club 1. FC Kaiserslautern on loan for the rest of the season. He joined 1. FC Kaiserslautern on loan for a second time in July 2021.

Loan to Rot-Weiss Essen
On 29 August 2022, Götze was loaned to Rot-Weiss Essen by his request.

International career

Youth
On 25 June 2017, the Germany national under-19 team include Götze in their final squad for the 2017 edition of the UEFA European Under-19 Championship. Götze made his youth international debut on 9 July 2017, coming on as a substitute in the 81st minute for Jonas Busam in the 4–1 loss to England in the third round of the group stage. Germany were this eliminated from the tournament, finishing third in the group.

Personal life
Felix was born in Dortmund, North Rhine-Westphalia, and is the younger brother of Mario Götze and Fabian Götze.

Career statistics

Notes

References

External links
 
 
 
 
 

1998 births
Living people
Footballers from Dortmund
German footballers
Association football central defenders
Germany youth international footballers
FC Bayern Munich II players
FC Bayern Munich footballers
FC Augsburg players
1. FC Kaiserslautern players
Rot-Weiss Essen players
Bundesliga players
3. Liga players
Regionalliga players